Malmö City Library is a municipal public library in Malmö, Sweden, which opened on 12 December 1905. It has 550,000 different media, about 10,000 DVDs and 33,500 music CDs. In 2006, it became the first library in Sweden to lend video games.

History 
Malmö City Library first opened on 12 December 1905, then in Hotel Tunneln. At that time they had 3,096 volumes – books and periodicals. In 1946, it moved to "The Castle" at Regementsgatan. The Castle, as it had come to be known as, was originally built for Malmö Museum, and was designed by the architects John Smedberg and Fredrik Sundbärg who had been inspired by Danish and Southern Swedish renaissance castles.

Malmö City Library, as it is today, consists of three buildings. "The Calendar of light" was designed by the Danish architect Henning Larsen and was inaugurated 31 May 1997. The Castle was restored and re-inaugurated 24 September 1999. These two main buildings are linked by a building called "The Cylinder", where the entrance, an information desk, a return desk and a cafe are located.

References

External links 

 Malmö City Library – Official Site

1905 establishments in Sweden
Buildings and structures in Malmö
Libraries in Sweden
Modernist architecture in Sweden
Library buildings completed in 1997
Tourist attractions in Malmö